Aspidiotinae is a large subfamily of armored scale insects, with 193 genera.

References

 
Diaspididae
Hemiptera subfamilies